Judith Henry (born 1942) is a New York-based artist  that creates multimedia art works exploring interior versus public self. Henry often uses newspapers, telephone books, and film reels. She also uses snapshot photography. After graduating from college, she moved to New York and married artist Jaime Davidovich, with whom she has two daughters. She currently lives in Williamsburg, Brooklyn.

Early life and education
Henry received a Bachelor of Fine Arts from Carnegie-Mellon University.

Career

Pages of Freud (1971), Henry crosshatches lines onto page after page of Freud’s writings, signaling her persistent doubts about the therapeutic potential of language. She continues mining this vein in both Telephone Book Series (1973) and Male and Female (1982, 2009).

Henry designed Crumpled Paper Stationary as part of Wooster Enterprises (1976–79), a collaborative, conceptual business she began with artist Jaime Davidovich. Using their own original designs and additional prototypes by George Maciunas, Davidovich and Henry sold small paper products—greeting cards, writing pads, confetti, and other paper goods—to large and small stores throughout the United States. Their intent was to bring conceptual art into a truly commercial arena. After Wooster Enterprises failed, The Museum of Modern Art continued to produce Henry’s crumpled paper stationary. For years, it was one of the Museum store’s best selling items.

Awards 

 2022 Pollock-Krasner Foundation Grant

Books

 2020 "Beauty Masks", published essay by Grace Graupe-Pillard
 2006 "Overheard in America", Atria Books
 2002 "Overheard on the Way to MOMAQueens"
 2001 "Overheard in Love", Universe Publishers
 2001 "Overheard While Shopping", Universe Publishers
 2001 "Overheard at the Bookstore", Universe Publishers 
 2000 "Overheard at the Museum", Universe Publishers

Exhibitions

 2021 Davis Orton Gallery, Hudson, NY
 2018 Casting Call, January, BravinLee Programs, New York, NY
 2017 Alternate Lives, Judith Henry and Morton Bartlett, National Arts Club, New York, NY
 2016 Me as Her, Visual Arts Center of New Jersey, NJ
 2015 Solo exhibition, BravinLee Programs, New York, NY
 2014 Women Choose Women Again, Visual Arts center of New Jersey, Summit, NJ 
 2012 Davis Orton Gallery, Hudson, NY 
 2012 Churner and Churner
 2011  0.00156 acres Gallery, September, Brooklyn 
 2010 National Academy Invitational Exhibition, New York
 2008  Festival de Cine International de Barcelona, Berta Bornstein
 2008 San Francisco Short Film Festival, Berta Bornstein
 2008 Technocracy, Carnegie Mellon University, Regina Gouger Miller Gallery, The Southern Express, Pittsburgh, PA
 2008 Philadelphia Independent Film Festival, Berta Bornstein
 2008 Ace Film Festival, The Southern Express, New York, NY
 2005 Artsumer Gallery, Statement in the Art, Istanbul, Turkey
 2003 Reading Between the Lines, 147 Wooster Arts Space, New York, NY
 2002 Barbara Kraków Gallery, Boston, MA
 2001 Emily Davis Gallery, University of Akron, Akron, OH
 1996 25th Year Retrospective, Douglass College, New Brunswick, NJ
 1996 Tartessos Gallery, Barcelona, Spain
 1992 Bound & Unbound, New York, NY
 1989 Graphic Design in America, Walker Art Center, Minneapolis, MN
 1988 Alternating Currents, Alternative Museum, New York, NY
 1986 White Columns Presents Video, White Columns, New York, NY
 1985 Video Festival, A.I.R. Gallery
 1984 Between Here and Nowhere, Riverside Gallery, London, England
 1984 White Columns, New York, NY
 1981 Centre de Documentacio d’Art Actual, Barcelona, Spain
 1980 Two Plus Gallery, Denver, CO
 1978 Douglass College, Rutgers University, New Brunswick, New Jersey
 1978 Carnegie-Mellon Alumni Exhibition, New York, NY
 1978 A.I.R. Gallery, New York, NY
 1977 All-Ohio Painting and Sculpture, Dayton Art Institute, Dayton, OH
 1977 Hundred Acres Gallery, New York, NY, solo exhibition
 1976 New Gallery, Cleveland, OH
 1976 John Carroll University, Cleveland, OH

Installations

 2011  Who I saw in NY 1970-2000 0.00156 acres Gallery, New York, NY
 2003 Walking and Talking, Wooster Arts Space, New York, NY
 2001  Her Personality Makes Her Prettier, Ricco Maresca Gallery, New York, NY
 2001  Overheard in Los Angeles, Neiman Marcus, window and store installation, Los Angeles, CA
 2000  Overheard in New York, Bergdorf Goodman window installation, NY

Profiles and interviews

 2017     Hyperallergic, ArtRX NYC by Hrag Vartanian
 2015     1stdibs “Introspective”, Carol Kino, Introspective Magazine
 2012     September 17, Huffpost Arts & Culture
 2012     August 10, The New York Times, “Wooster Enterprises”, Holland Cotter
 2012     August 1, The Village Voice, Robert Shuster, “Wooster Enterprises”, New York
 2012     July, Artslant, Carmen Winant, New York
 2012     The Wild, Serena Qiu, blog magazine, The Visionaries Issue
 2009     Winter, Unsuspecting on the A-train, Working Class Magazine
 2006 December, Samantha Grice, National Post, Canada
 2002 May, interview with Jeanne Moos, CNN
 2001 July 25, segment on KTLA television, Los Angeles, Gail Anderson
 2001 April, profile on Gotham TV, produced by Michael Pearlman and  Elizabeth Curtin
 2001 February, Rob Perree, Kunstbeeld, Amsterdam
 2001 January 30, Edward Nawotka, Publishers Weekly
 2000 October 1, interview by Joe Torres, American Broadcasting Company|ABC Eyewitness News
 2000 September, Hannah Wallace, ARTnews
 2000 August 7, Bill Bell, The Daily News (New York)|Daily News,  "Drop Her a Line Anytime]"
 2000 May, interview on MetroGuide TV with Robert Verdi
 The New York Times, Playing in the Neighborhood]

References

External links
 JudithHenry.net

Living people
American conceptual artists
Women conceptual artists
Carnegie Mellon University College of Fine Arts alumni
Artists from Cleveland
American multimedia artists
1942 births
21st-century American women artists